Teen Scene is an Australian television series which aired from 1964 to 1965 on the ABC. Produced in Melbourne, it was hosted by Johnny Chester. It was a half-hour music series aimed at teenagers. The series also featured a Hall of Fame segment, and regular bands were The Chessmen and The Thin Men.

References

External links
Teen Scene on IMDb

1964 Australian television series debuts
1965 Australian television series endings
Black-and-white Australian television shows
Australian music television series
English-language television shows
Australian Broadcasting Corporation original programming